United American Lines, the common name of the American Shipping and Commercial Corporation, was a shipping company founded by W. Averell Harriman in 1920. Intended as a way for Harriman to make his mark in the business world outside of his father, railroad magnate E. H. Harriman, the company was financed by the younger Harriman's mother, Mary Williamson Harriman. Entering into the shipping world with little experience, Harriman's United American Lines entered into agreements with Hamburg America Line ( or HAPAG), which was determined to recover after the financial disaster that befell the German company as a result of World War I.

After the brief and unsuccessful attempt at transatlantic service by the United States Mail Steamship Company (U.S. Mail Line) ended, Harriman's United American Line was temporarily assigned control over the former U.S. Mail Line ships in 1921.

His inexperience taken advantage of by HAPAG and the almost complete end of immigration to the United States drained millions of dollars from the company and led Harriman to sell the company to HAPAG in 1926.

Passenger fleet
 
 
 
 
 
 Resolute

References

External links
 

Transport companies established in 1920
Defunct shipping companies of the United States
1920 establishments in New York (state)
Transport companies disestablished in 1926
1926 disestablishments in New York (state)